Kewley is a surname of Manx origin, derived from Mac Amhlaoibh, meaning "son of Amhlaoibh". It may refer to:

Edward Kewley (1852–1940), English sportsman who played rugby union for England and cricket for Lancashire
James Kewley Ward (1819–1910), Canadian lumber merchant and politician
Jeremy Kewley (born 1960), Australian actor; convicted of multiple sexual offences of 16 boys
John Kewley, several people
Kevin Kewley (born 1955), English retired professional footballer who played in both England and the United States
Lisa Kewley, Australian Hubble Fellow in Astronomy at the University of Hawaii Institute for Astronomy

See also
Cowley (surname)

Manx-language surnames
Patronymic surnames